Mulley is a surname. Notable people with the surname include:

Clare Mulley, Biographer of Eglantyne Jebb, the Founder of the British charity Save the Children, and Krystyna Skarbek, aka Christine Granville, Britain's first female special agent of World War II
Frederick Mulley PC (1918–1995), British Labour politician, barrister-at-law, and economist
James Mulley (born 1988), English footballer
Tim Alek Mulley, (born 1981), American musician, independent drummer, and recording producer/engineer

See also
Meuilley
Mouilly
Mullally
O'Malley (disambiguation)